The North Caledonian Football Association is a football association operating throughout the Highlands and Islands of Scotland and is a recognised body of the Scottish Football Association (SFA) and as such has its senior football competitions officially registered with the SFA.

History 
The formation of the Inverness Junior Football Association on 31 January 1888 saw the introduction of the Inverness Junior Cup. After the final in 1888 the association was renamed the North of Scotland Junior Football Association and the competition the North of Scotland Junior Cup.

The Association's league competition was later introduced in 1896 as the "North of Scotland Junior League" with the initial aim of providing a league format for its junior members and predominantly the "2nd XI" teams from senior Highland Football League clubs. Upon its formation these teams mostly came from the Inverness area.  By 1906 though, the Association had welcomed several new member teams from outside the Inverness-shire area, specifically Nairn Thistle and Dingwall Victoria United (later known as Ross County) broadening the coverage of the league across the North. Other clubs from across the Highland counties followed suit, with Muir of Ord and Tore United among those to join.

In 1935 the league dropped its junior status, possibly due to the Scottish Junior Football Association's objections to Senior clubs involvement, and became known as the North of Scotland "2nd XI" League (it was also known colloquially as either the Highland Reserve League or Highland Alliance, the latter a nod to the southern reserve league the Scottish Football Alliance). It was recognised as a senior football league with teams eligible to apply for Scottish FA membership. By the late 1960s/early 1970s, the Highland League reserve teams which had dominated the league gradually dropped out of contention, with most finding that it was not financially viable to run "2nd XI" or reserve teams at a senior level. At the same time, the league began to see an influx of senior football teams joining from the surrounding counties of Easter Ross, Caithness and Sutherland.

By the 1980s, the league had representation from teams all across the North, including as far as Fort William. In a bid to shake off the "2nd XI" tag (and the inference of being "second best" to the Highland League) the member clubs in the league took the decision to rename the league at the 1984 annual general meeting of the North of Scotland 2nd XI Football Association in Bonar Bridge, where teams voted unanimously to change the name of the association to the North Caledonian Football Association and the name of the league competition to the North Caledonian Football League.

In 2020, it was announced that the North Caledonian League is working with the Highland League and North Region Junior FA to form a sixth tier of the Scottish football league system for the far north of the country, with a view to feeding eligible clubs via promotion into the Highland League. It was also announced, along with 4 teams being added to the ranks (2 of which are returning sides) that the league would be temporarily split into two divisions.

In April 2021, it was announced that subject to SFA approval, the North Caledonian League would be joined at Tier 6 by the North Super League and a rebranded Midlands League (the remaining Junior East Region clubs that play in Tayside) to form a fully-integrated tier below the Highland League from 2021-22. The leagues at that level entered the Scottish pyramid later in July.

In June 2022, it was announced that the winner of the league, no matter whether they were SFA Licensed or not, would qualify directly to the Scottish Cup Preliminary Round, starting with Invergordon, who won the 2021-22 season. However, it was also confirmed that if an already SFA Licensed team (Golspie Sutherland and Fort William) or a reserve team (Clachnacuddin and Nairn County) were to win the league, the Scottish Cup spot would not pass down to the highest ranked team that would otherwise be eligible.

Membership 
As well as holding membership of the North Caledonian FA, member clubs are also governed by the constitution of the Scottish Football Association, and as such disciplinary and registration matters are handled by the Scottish Football Association. This is a unique situation in that member clubs are not required to be full members of the Scottish Football Association, despite their players holding senior SFA registrations (professional and amateur).

Golspie Sutherland are the only North Caledonian FA member club to hold full membership of the Scottish Football Association and since season 2007–08 they have obtained direct entry to the Scottish Cup. Previously, they were required to enter the Scottish Qualifying Cup (North).

Since 2013, membership has been extended beyond the Highlands to senior clubs in the Islands, with Orkney, Shetland and Lewis & Harris all entering teams.

Member teams have previously included reserve teams of Highland Football League clubs alongside teams from throughout the Highlands and Islands region.

Competitions

North Caledonian League 
A senior Scottish FA registered competition, the North Caledonian League is an annual league competition which runs from July/August to April, with teams playing each other both home and away with a championship team determined after all games have been played.

Over the years, the North Caledonian League has been characterised by the number of clubs who have used it as a 'stepping-stone' to the professional ranks of Scottish football. Among those to have 'graduated' from the league are Wick Academy and Fort William who left to join the Highland Football League, and much earlier Ross County, who played in the league under their former name of Dingwall Victoria United between 1896 and 1929 before renaming to join the Highland Football League.

The league has also been home in recent years to the reserve teams of Scottish Football League clubs Inverness Caledonian Thistle and Ross County.

Cups 

The North Caledonian Cup (also previously referred to as the North of Scotland Reserve Cup or PCT North Cup) was the first competition to be contested under the auspices of the North Caledonian FA during the latter part 1887–88 season and it remains part of the season calendar today.Member teams of the North Caledonian FA also compete in the Football Times Cup, which has existed as part of the North Caledonian FA season since the 1920s.

Several other cups have been contested or awarded during the Association's history, each of which are inactive or played for when season time allows:

 Jock Mackay Memorial Cup
Chic Allan/Port Services Cup
 Morris Newton/SWL Cup
 Ness Cup (revived as the 'Division 2' trophy for the 2020–21 season)

Member clubs

League and cup members

Guest members for entry into cup competitions only

Member clubs for 2022–23 season 

 Alness United
 Clachnacuddin Reserves
 Bonar Bridge
 Fort William
 Golspie Sutherland
 Halkirk United
 Invergordon
 Inverness Athletic
 Loch Ness
 Nairn County A
 Orkney
 St Duthus
 Thurso
 Bunillidh Thistle (inactive)

Recent history
The 2008–09 season saw the league reduced to ten teams following the withdrawal of Dornoch City and Inverness City joining the Junior leagues. Late applicants Tain Thistle took the league membership up to ten teams for the start of the season. Fort William entered a reserve side in the league for season 2009–10 as the first Highland Football League "reserve" side to compete since 1999. Helmsdale based Bunillidh Thistle withdrew whilst Alness United took a year out, and former members Dingwall Thistle returned to complete a ten-team league. Season 2010–11 saw Alness return after a one-year absence whilst Tain Thistle withdrew after two seasons.

Clachnacuddin again entered a reserve side for season 2011–12, whilst Fort William Reserves dropped out due to problems with pitch availability. Before the season started, both Bonar Bridge and Invergordon withdrew, leaving just eight teams in the league. The following season 2012–13, Invergordon returned while Balintore and Dingwall Thistle both withdrew from the league.

Invergordon again withdrew from competition for the 2013–14 season, however, the void was filled by a new team from Dornoch in Sutherland United. That same season, a newly formed Shetland team and Lewis & Harris both registered for competition in the North Caledonian Cup. The following season, 2014–15, Shetland and Lewis & Harris also competed in the Jock Mackay Cup, while a new team, Orkney, was accepted as a member of the league – the first Islands team to be admitted. Invergordon returned a year later following a two-year period of abeyance, however, along with Muir of Ord Rovers, Sutherland United withdrew from the competition after just their second season, taking the number of competing teams down to six for season 2015–16.

The league experienced an upturn in interest from Highland sides in 2016. A total of eight teams registered for league competition in 2016–17, with St Duthus returning to represent Tain and a new team Inverness Athletic was also accepted. The league grew in numbers again in 2017 with the revival of Bunillidh Thistle after almost ten years absence, and for the 2019-20 season, Bonar Bridge reformed and were admitted to the league.

In 2020, two new clubs, Loch Ness and Scourie joined the league, along with returnees, Nairn County 'A' and Alness United - taking the membership of the league to 13 teams for the first time in over 20 years. For the 2020-21 season, clubs agreed to play in two leagues of six (Bunillidh opted out) during the Covid-19 pandemic as a means of reducing the amount of games.

Previous champions

Club performance

* - Shared title

BOLD indicates the team is currently playing within the NCFA

Italics indicates the team is defunct or merged with another team that does not play in the NCFA

References

External links
 Website
 Twitter
 Facebook
 Scottish Football Historical Archive
 Non League Scotland

Football leagues in Scotland
 
Football in Orkney
Sport in Caithness
Sport in Sutherland
Football in Moray
Football in Highland (council area)
Amateur association football in Scotland
1896 establishments in Scotland
Sixth level football leagues in Europe